Bridget Jane Fonda (born January 27, 1964) is a retired American actress. She is known for  her roles in The Godfather Part III (1990), Single White Female (1992), Singles (1992), Point of No Return (1993), It Could Happen to You (1994), Jackie Brown (1997), A Simple Plan (1998), and Kiss of the Dragon (2001). She is the daughter of Peter Fonda, niece of Jane Fonda, and granddaughter of Henry Fonda. Fonda was nominated for a Golden Globe Award for Best Supporting Actress for playing Mandy Rice-Davies in the 1989 film Scandal and provided the voice for Jenna in the 1995 animated feature film Balto. She received an Emmy Award nomination for the 1997 TV film In the Gloaming, and a second Golden Globe Award nomination for the 2001 TV film No Ordinary Baby.

Early life
Fonda was born on January 27, 1964, in Los Angeles, California, to a family of actors, including her grandfather Henry Fonda, father Peter Fonda, and her aunt Jane Fonda. Her mother, Susan Jane Brewer, is an artist. Fonda is named after actress Margaret Sullavan's daughter Bridget Hayward. Her maternal grandmother, Mary Sweet, married businessman Noah Dietrich.

Fonda's parents divorced, and her father Peter later married Portia Rebecca Crockett (former wife of author Thomas McGuane). Crockett raised Fonda, her brother Justin, and older stepbrother Thomas McGuane Jr. in the Coldwater Canyon section of Los Angeles, as well as in Paradise Valley, south of Livingston, Montana.

Career
Fonda became involved with the theatre when she was cast in a school production of Harvey. She studied method acting at the Lee Strasberg Theatre Institute as part of New York University's Tisch School of the Arts acting program and graduated from NYU in 1986.

She made her movie debut at age five (filmed at age four) in Easy Rider (1969) as a child in the hippie commune that Peter Fonda and Dennis Hopper visit on their trek across the United States.
Her second (non-speaking) part was in the 1982 comedy Partners. In 1988, she got her first substantial film role in Scandal, and appeared in You Can't Hurry Love and Shag.

Her breakthrough role was as a journalist in The Godfather Part III, released in late 1990. After gaining additional work experience in a few theater productions, she was cast in the lead in Barbet Schroeder's Single White Female, followed by a role in Cameron Crowe's ensemble comedy Singles (both 1992).

Fonda starred in 1993's Point of No Return, an American remake of the 1990 French film Nikita. A review in The New Yorker cited her "provocative, taunting assertiveness". In 1997, she was on the same flight as Quentin Tarantino when he offered her the part of Melanie in Jackie Brown.

In 2001, Fonda starred with Jet Li in the action thriller film Kiss of the Dragon. Her final film role was in the 2001 movie The Whole Shebang. Her final role overall was the title role in the TV movie Snow Queen in 2002, and she has not appeared on screen since, having retired from acting.

Personal life

Fonda met Eric Stoltz in 1986 and they began dating in 1990. The relationship ended after eight years.

On February 27, 2003, she suffered a serious car crash in Los Angeles that caused a fracture in a vertebra. In March of the same year, she became engaged to film composer and former Oingo Boingo frontman Danny Elfman, and they married in November. In 2005, they had a son together.

After her engagement to Elfman, Fonda withdrew from acting and has concentrated on family life.

Filmography

Film

Television

Award nominations
1990: Golden Globe Award for Best Supporting Actress in a Motion Picture for Scandal
1997: Primetime Emmy Award for Outstanding Supporting Actress in a Miniseries or a Movie for In the Gloaming
2002: Golden Globe Award for Best Performance by an Actress In A Mini-series or Motion Picture Made for Television for No Ordinary Baby (also known as After Amy)

References

Further reading

External links

 
 
 

1964 births
Living people
20th-century American actresses
21st-century American actresses
Actresses from Los Angeles
American film actresses
American television actresses
American voice actresses
Elfman family
Bridget
Harvard-Westlake School alumni
Lee Strasberg Theatre and Film Institute alumni
Tisch School of the Arts alumni